Brookland is a historic tobacco plantation complex and national historic district located near Grassy Creek, Granville County, North Carolina.  The plantation house was built about 1817, and is a two-story, four bay, heavy timber frame Georgian / Federal style dwelling.  It has a gable roof, hall-and-parlor plan, and cut stone exterior end chimneys.  Also on the property are the contributing kitchen, smokehouse, schoolhouse, three log tobacco barns, log striphouse, log stable, hay barn, chicken house, and a frame smokehouse.

It was listed on the National Register of Historic Places in 1988.

References

Tobacco plantations in the United States
Plantation houses in North Carolina
Farms on the National Register of Historic Places in North Carolina
Historic districts on the National Register of Historic Places in North Carolina
Georgian architecture in North Carolina
Federal architecture in North Carolina
Houses completed in 1817
Houses in Granville County, North Carolina
National Register of Historic Places in Granville County, North Carolina